The San Jose Sharks are a professional ice hockey team based in San Jose, California. The team is a member of the Pacific Division in the Western Conference of the National Hockey League (NHL). Established for the 1991–92 NHL season, the Sharks initially played games at the Cow Palace before moving to SAP Center in 1993. The Sharks are owned by San Jose Sports & Entertainment Enterprises.

There have been eleven head coaches in Sharks franchise history. George Kingston was the first coach in Sharks history and lasted two seasons, which included a 1992–93 campaign where the team set an NHL record for losses in a season with 71. Todd McLellan has the most games coached (540), wins (311), points (688) and playoff games coached (62) in franchise history as of the end of the 2021-22 season. Peter DeBoer is the leader in playoff wins, with 32 as of the end of the 2019 Stanley Cup playoffs, and the only coach to take the team to a Stanley Cup Final. Cap Raeder is the leader in winning percentage, winning his sole game as head coach on December 3, 2002 against the Phoenix Coyotes. Jim Wiley holds the franchise records for fewest wins (17) and fewest points (37), while Kingston holds the record for lowest winning percentage (.192). The current head coach of the Sharks is David Quinn, who was introduced as coach on July 26, 2022.

Key

Coaches

See also
 List of NHL head coaches
 List of current NHL captains
 List of NHL players

Notes
  A running total of the number of coaches of the Sharks. Thus, any coach who had two separate terms as head coach is only counted once.
  Before 1999, overtime losses were included in the loss column; Since 2005, ties are no longer possible.
  Wiley served as interim coach for the remainder of the 1995–96 season following the firing of Constantine.
  Raeder served as interim coach for a single game during the 2002–03 season following the firing of Sutter and prior to the hiring of Wilson.
  Boughner served as interim coach for the remainder of the 2019–20 season following the firing of DeBoer before being named full-time coach.

Sources
 San Jose Sharks

References

San Jose Sharks head coaches
 
head coaches